Cleistanthus hylandii is a plant in the family Phyllanthaceae which is endemic to north east Queensland, Australia. It was first described by Airy Shaw in the Kew Bulletin in 1976.

Conservation
This species is listed by both IUCN and the Queensland Department of Environment and Science as least concern.

Gallery

References

External links
 
 
 View a map of recorded sightings of Cleistanthus hylandii at the Australasian Virtual Herbarium
 See images of Cleistanthus hylandii on Flickriver

Cleistanthus
Flora of Queensland
Species described in 1976
Endemic flora of Australia